Palmetto station is a Metrorail rapid transit station in unincorporated Miami-Dade County, Florida (with a Miami address), United States, just near the town of Medley. It is the current northern terminus of the Metrorail system. This station is located near the intersection of Northwest 77th Street and 79 Avenue, opening to service May 30, 2003. It is adjacent to the Palmetto Expressway (SR 826) (its namesake), providing convenience to west Miami-Dade and Broward commuters traveling into Downtown Miami. The station is in a low density warehouse area and has low ridership. In 2023 a 900 unit housing project was proposed for the site.900 apartments

Station layout
The station has two tracks and an island platform, with parking north of the station structure.

Places of interest
Miami-Dade Animal Services Shelter/Adoption Center
Town of Medley
City of Doral
Miami-Dade Warehouse District

References

External links

MDT – Metrorail Stations
 Station from Google Maps Street View

Green Line (Metrorail)
Metrorail (Miami-Dade County) stations in Miami-Dade County, Florida
Railway stations in the United States opened in 2003
2003 establishments in Florida